The Punjab Judicial Academy is an agency of the Government of Punjab, Pakistan. It was established in 2007 under The Punjab Judicial Academy Act, 2007. The Academy provides pre-service and in-service training to the judicial officers and court personnel. The management and administration of the Academy are run by the board under leadership of the Chief Justice of Lahore High Court and an appointed Director-General.

See also 
 Federal Judicial Academy
 Khyber Pakhtunkhwa Judicial Academy
 Balochistan Judicial Academy
 Sindh Judicial Academy
 Gilgit-Baltistan Judicial Academy

References

External links 
 Punjab Judicial Academy

Government agencies of Punjab, Pakistan
Legal organizations based in Pakistan
2007 establishments in Pakistan